Deh Now-e Allah Morad (also Romanized as Deh Now-e Allāh Morād; also known as Allāh Morād) is a village in Rig Rural District, in the Central District of Lordegan County, Chaharmahal and Bakhtiari Province, Iran. At the 2006 census, its population was 263, in 50 families.

References 

Populated places in Lordegan County